Marko Blažić (born 2 August 1985) is a Serbian professional footballer who plays as a midfielder for IMT.

Career
Blažić started out with his local club Mladenovac. He made a name for himself at Čukarički, before transferring to Red Star Belgrade in the winter of 2008, together with Pavle Ninkov. Blažić spent the following three years with the Red-Whites, before moving abroad to Slovak side Ružomberok in the winter of 2011. He subsequently played for Russian club Amkar Perm (2011–2012), as well as for Uzbekistani club Bunyodkor (2013), and Kazakhstani club Atyrau (2014).

In July 2015, Blažić returned to his homeland by signing a one-year deal with Radnički Niš.

Honours
Red Star Belgrade
 Serbian Cup: 2009–10

Bunyodkor
 Uzbek League: 2013
 Uzbekistan Cup: 2013

References

External links

 

1985 births
People from Mladenovac
Living people
Serbian footballers
Association football midfielders
OFK Mladenovac players
FK Radnički Beograd players
FK Čukarički players
Red Star Belgrade footballers
MFK Ružomberok players
FC Amkar Perm players
FC Bunyodkor players
FC Atyrau players
FK Radnički Niš players
AEL Kalloni F.C. players
PAS Lamia 1964 players
Apollon Smyrnis F.C. players
FK Rad players
FK IMT players
Serbian SuperLiga players
Slovak Super Liga players
Russian Premier League players
Uzbekistan Super League players
Kazakhstan Premier League players
Super League Greece players
Super League Greece 2 players
Football League (Greece) players
Serbian First League players
Serbian expatriate footballers
Expatriate footballers in Slovakia
Serbian expatriate sportspeople in Slovakia
Expatriate footballers in Russia
Serbian expatriate sportspeople in Russia
Expatriate footballers in Uzbekistan
Serbian expatriate sportspeople in Uzbekistan
Expatriate footballers in Kazakhstan
Serbian expatriate sportspeople in Kazakhstan
Expatriate footballers in Greece
Serbian expatriate sportspeople in Greece